Karolis Girulis (born 1 November 1986) is a Lithuanian sports shooter.

Biography 
Girulis represented Lithuania at the 2013 Summer Universiade, where he finished 6th in the 10 metre air rifle event. Girulis finished 27th at the inaugural 2015 European Games.

At the 2019 European Games, Lithuanian finished 24th in 50 metre rifle three positions event and 38th in 10 metre air rifle competition. At the 2021 European Shooting Championships Girulis reached the final in 50 metre rifle three positions event and qualified for 2020 Summer Olympics.

References

External links
 Girulis at ISSF

1986 births
Living people
Lithuanian male sport shooters
Sportspeople from Alytus
Shooters at the 2015 European Games
Shooters at the 2019 European Games
European Games competitors for Lithuania
Shooters at the 2020 Summer Olympics
Olympic shooters of Lithuania